The 1966 United States Senate election in New Mexico was held on November 8, 1966. Incumbent Democratic U.S. Senator Clinton Anderson won re-election to a fourth term. Democrats would not win this seat again until 2008.

Primary elections 
Primary elections were held on May 3, 1966.

Democratic primary

Candidate 
 Clinton Anderson, incumbent U.S. Senator

Results

Republican primary

Candidate 
 Anderson Carter, oilman and rancher and former State Representative

Results

General election

Result

See also 
 1966 United States Senate elections

References

Bibliography 
 
 

New Mexico
1966
United States Senate